Naturalis Biodiversity Center is a national museum of natural history and a research center on biodiversity in Leiden, Netherlands. It was named the European Museum of the Year 2021.
Although its current name and organization are relatively recent, the history of Naturalis can be traced back to the early 1800s. Its collection includes approximately 42 million specimens, making it one of the largest natural history collections in the world.

History
The beginnings of Naturalis go back to the creation of the Rijksmuseum van Natuurlijke Historie (abbreviated RMNH, National Museum of Natural History) by Dutch King William I on August 9, 1820. In 1878, the geological and mineralogical collections of the museum were split off into a separate museum, remaining distinct until the merger of the Rijksmuseum van Natuurlijke Historie with the Rijksmuseum van Geologie en Mineralogie (abbreviated RGM) in 1984, to form the Nationaal Natuurhistorisch Museum (NNM) or National Museum of Natural History.

In 1986, it was decided that the institution should become a public museum, and a new building was designed by the Dutch architect Fons Verheijen. The building's reception area incorporated the 1657-1661 Pesthuis, designed by Huybert Corneliszoon van Duyvenvlucht. Completed in 1998, it was opened on April 7, 1998, by Queen Beatrix of the Netherlands. The new building costs were about €60 million, making it the second most expensive museum building in the Netherlands.

In 2010 the National Museum of Natural History (Naturalis) further combined with the Zoological Museum Amsterdam (ZMA) of the University of Amsterdam, and the Dutch National Herbaria at the universities of Leiden, Amsterdam and Wageningen, to form the Nederlands Centrum voor Biodiversiteit (NCB Naturalis). The combined institute was formally opened as part of the ‘International Year of Biodiversity 2010’ by Education Minister Ronald Plasterk and Agriculture Minister Gerda Verburg.

In 2012 the name became the Naturalis Biodiversity Center. Naturalis has partnered with ETI Bioinformatics in support of the Catalog of Life (CoL), and is working with the Global Biodiversity Information Facility.
Funding is in place to support digitization of the massed collections.
In 2015, further renovation and expansion was planned, with a proposed design from Neutelings Riedijk Architecten. The Pesthuis (historical Plague hospital) will no longer be part of the complex.  However, a lawsuit by the previous architect postponed these plans. The museum, except the research facilities, was closed from September 2018 to mid 2019 due to renovations. Temporary exhibitions were held in the Pesthuis, the former entrance building, during the renovations. The new building was finished in the summer of 2019 with the museum opening again on August 31 of that year.

Within a year of the opening the museum had to close again in March 2020 due to the COVID-19 pandemic until June 2020. The museum reopened on June 8 with free entrance for essential workers. On July 1 the museum was reopened for the public charging full prices again. It closed again in the winters of 2020 and 2021 due to further national COVID-19 measures.

Naturalis was named the European Museum of the Year 2021 in the annual awards of the European Museum Forum. The jury cited Naturalis as "a very inventive museum with beautiful exhibitions",  and also that the museum’s "agile ability" to move on and transform itself.

Collection

The current museum is known for the numerous objects in its collections. Prior to the merger with the Zoölogisch Museum Amsterdam and National Herbarium of the Netherlands, there were approximately 10 million zoological and geological specimens in the Naturalis collection. Following the merger with the collections of the Zoölogisch Museum Amsterdam and National Herbarium of the Netherlands in 2010–12, there are now approximately 42 million specimens:

The largest part of the collections are stored in a 60-meter-high tower, a landmark in Leiden, opened in April 1998. Some parts of the collections are stored in a depot in the former museum building at the Raamsteeg in the city center of Leiden.

The Index Herbariorum code assigned to Naturalis is L and it is used when citing housed herbarium specimens.

Explorers
Among the collections at Naturalis are the papers and field notes of a number of early travelers and naturalists, including the following:

Exhibitions

Permanent exhibitions 
The museum has several permanent exhibitions:
 Live Science (a highly interactive gallery dedicated to displaying the institute's function as science center and collection depot to the public)
 Life (provides a tour along multiple biotopes, from the deep sea to the sky, showing mounted specimens and replica's of the highlights of the Earth's present fauna)
Earth (exhibits the way human culture is entangled with system earth. Artefacts and minerals from four regions with high geological activity, Hawaii, Japan, Brazil and Iceland, are displayed surrounded by a panorama that combines the environment of these regions)
 Dinosaur Era (Exhibits a selection of fossils from the Paleozoic and mainly the Mesozoic period with a focus on dinosaurs. The highlight of the gallery is Trix which is one of the most complete and best preserved Tyrannosaurus skeletons found so far. On top of that, Trix is one of the two only authentic tyrannosaurs that are permanently kept in Europe. The other one is Tristan, which belongs to a Danish proprietor albeit being currently on exhibit at the Natural History Museum, Berlin, in Germany.)
Ice Age (dedicated to the Netherlands during the last ice age, a large scale model showcases the Dutch landscape and its fauna of that time, a large collection of Dutch Pleistocene fossils is exhibited as well as full skeletons of mammals from that time, including a woolly mammoth) 
Early Humans (a homage to Dutch scientist Eugène Dubois and his discovery of the Java Man (Homo erectus) which are kept at Naturalis. The holotype Trinil 2 is on display here.)
Seduction (showcases procreation in Nature, it illustrates the rituals of courting, coupling, and raising offspring in a playful way)
Death (a gallery dedicated to circle of life)

Current Temporary exhibitions 
 Nature's Treasure Trove (25 valuable and extraordinary collection objections that are not on permanent display are publicly displayed under special conditions to celebrate the 200 year anniversary of the museum's collection) - September 30, 2020 - September 5, 2021

Past Temporary exhibitions 
During the renovation of the main building the former entrance building, the historic Pesthuis, was used for three temporary exhibits from 2016 to 2018.
 T-rex in Town (before Trix entered in permanent exhibition at the Museum, the skeleton was first exhibited at the Pesthuis from September 10, 2016, to June 5, 2017).
Op Expeditie met Naturalis (English: Expedition with Naturalis, a summer holiday program aimed to involve children with science and nature from June 24 to September 10, 2017)
GIF! (English: VENOM!, an exhibit with live animals, centred around the popular Dutch biologist and Naturalis researcher Freek Vonk, showing the different kinds of venom and poison in nature from October 14, 2017, to September 2, 2018)

Virtual Museum 
During the COVID-19 pandemic the museum was made virtually accessible. The visitor can move freely through the exhibitions with information and short videos available in Dutch or English to add context to some of the museum's highlights.

 Virtual Museum

Research Institute 
Besides its role as a museum, Naturalls is also a scientific research institute collaborating with most Dutch universities. Around 120 researchers and 200 guest researchers are working at Naturalis in nine groups on topics such as biodiversity, botany, marine biology, or geology. Naturalis is a (co-)initiator of several citizen science projects. With the project Arise, which aims to map all biodiversity in the Netherlands, Naturalis is a player in one of the largest Dutch research infrastructure projects.

Former Buildings

Collections

Visitors 

Naturalis had an estimated 285,000 visitors and was the 15th most visited museum of the Netherlands in 2013. The museum had a record number of 339,550 visitors in 2015.

References

External links

 Naturalis, official website
 Naturalis extinct birds, 3D presentation
 Naturalis Biodiversity Center at Google Cultural Institute
 Bioportal: access to the Naturalis digital collection

Buildings and structures completed in 1998
Museums established in 1984
Museums in Leiden
National museums of the Netherlands
Natural history museums in the Netherlands
Paleontology in the Netherlands
Science and technology in the Netherlands
Photo archives in the Netherlands